Cosmosoma juanita is a moth of the subfamily Arctiinae. It was described by Berthold Neumoegen in 1894. It is found on Cuba.

References

juanita
Moths described in 1894
Endemic fauna of Cuba